Will Taʻufoʻou (born June 19, 1986) is an American football fullback who is currently a free agent. He was signed by the Chicago Bears as an undrafted free agent in 2009. He played college football at California.

College career
Taʻufoʻou played at Cal for four years, during which running backs Marshawn Lynch (2005 and 2006), Justin Forsett (2007), and Jahvid Best (2008) each ran for more than 1,000 yards, with Best becoming the 2008 Pac-10 rushing leader.

Professional career

Chicago Bears
Taʻufoʻou was signed by the Chicago Bears as a free agent on April 27, 2009. He was waived on September 4 and was placed on the team's practice squad on September 5, where he remained the entire season.

After his practice squad contract expired at season's end, Taʻufoʻou was re-signed to a future contract by the Bears on January 4, 2010.
He re-signed with the Bears again on July 29, 2011. He was waived on September 6.

Cleveland Browns
The Cleveland Browns signed him to their practice squad on September 14, 2011. He was released from the practice squad on November 8.

Jacksonville Jaguars
The Jacksonville Jaguars signed Ta'ufo'ou on July 28, 2012. He was waived, signed to the practice squad, and promoted to the active roster multiple times in the 2012 season. He appeared in six games. He was signed to the active roster at the conclusion of the 2012 season. 

In the 2013 preseason, Ta'ufo'ou assumed the starting fullback position after the departure of nine-year veteran Greg Jones.

He became a free agent after the 2014 season.

References

External links
Jacksonville Jaguars bio
Chicago Bears bio
California Golden Bears bio

1986 births
Living people
American football fullbacks
American people of Tongan descent
American sportspeople of Samoan descent
California Golden Bears football players
Chicago Bears players
Cleveland Browns players
Denver Broncos players
Jacksonville Jaguars players
People from Redwood City, California
Players of American football from California
Sportspeople from the San Francisco Bay Area
Tennessee Titans players